Wallengrenia otho, the southern broken dash or broken dash skipper, is a butterfly of the family Hesperiidae. It was originally described by Smith in 1797. It is found from eastern Texas and the southeastern United States, south through the West Indies and Central America to Argentina. Strays can be found as far north as central Missouri, northern Kentucky and Delaware.

The wingspan is 24–35 mm. Adults are on wing from April to October in two generations (sometimes a partial third) in most of North America. In peninsular Florida and southern Texas, adults are on wing all year round.

The larvae feed on Paspalum species and Stenotaphrum secundatum. Adults feed on the nectar from flowers including pickerelweed, selfheal and sweet pepperbush.

Subspecies
There appears to be some uncertainty as to whether Wallengrenia egeremet is a subspecies of W. otho.
Wallengrenia otho otho (Georgia to Mexico and Brazil (Amazonas))
Wallengrenia otho drury (Latreille, [1824]) (Pennsylvania, Puerto Rico)
Wallengrenia otho clavus (Erichson, 1848) (Mexico to Brazil, Trinidad, Guyana, Surinam, Venezuela)
Wallengrenia otho misera (Lucas, 1857) (Cuba, Bahamas, Honduras)
Wallengrenia otho ophites (Mabille, 1878) (Antilles, Dominica)
Wallengrenia otho vesuria (Plötz, 1882) (Jamaica)
Wallengrenia otho sapuca Evans, 1955 (Paraguay)

References

External links
Butterflies and Moths of North America

Hesperiini
Butterflies of Central America
Butterflies of the Caribbean
Butterflies of North America
Hesperiidae of South America
Butterflies of Cuba
Lepidoptera of Argentina
Lepidoptera of Brazil
Lepidoptera of Jamaica
Insects of Antigua and Barbuda
Insects of Puerto Rico
Insects of the Dominican Republic
Fauna of the Southeastern United States
Butterflies described in 1797